Itzhak Fintzi (Izko Finzi) (born 25 April 1933) is a Bulgarian film and stage actor.

He was born in Sofia, where he graduated from the dramatic art academy.

He graduated from the Bulgarian National Academy of Theater and Film Arts in 1955, and made his debut in the movie Zvezdi (1959).

He is the father of actor Samuel Finzi.

Filmography

External links

1933 births
Living people
Bulgarian male film actors
Bulgarian male stage actors
Male actors from Sofia
Bulgarian people of Jewish descent
Bulgarian Sephardi Jews
20th-century Bulgarian male actors